This is a list of United National Party MPs. It includes all parliamentarians that were elected to the Parliament of Sri Lanka representing the United National Party from 1946 to present day. The names in bold are the members of the party that became the President/Prime Minister of Sri Lanka.

List of Parliamentarians

A 
 Ossie Abeygunasekera
 Ashoka Abeysinghe
 Vajira Abeywardena
 Keerthilatha Abeywickrama
 Keerthi Abeywickrama
 Sumanadasa Abeywickrama
 A. R. A. M. Abubucker
 M. L. Ahamed Fareeth
 Lakshman Algama
 Ranjith Aluwihare
 Alick Aluwihare
 Bernard Aluwihare
 Wasantha Aluwihare
 John Amaratunga
 Sarath Amunugama (politician)
 D. P. Atapattu
 Lalith Athulathmudali
 Tissa Attanayake
 Gamini Atukorale
 Thalatha Atukorale

B 
 Bakeer Markar
 M. D. Banda
 R. M. Dharmadasa Banda
 Nalin Bandara
 Palitha Range Bandara
 Ranjith Madduma Bandara
 Indika Bandaranayake
 Bandula Lal Bandarigoda
 Harold Herath
 Rohitha Bogollagama

C 
 A. R. M. Abdul Cader
 M. Canagaratnam
 K. N. Choksy

D 
 P. Dayaratna
 Anandatissa de Alwis
Padmalal de Alwis
 Ronnie de Mel
 Fredrick de Silva
 George E. de Silva
 K. W. Devanayagam
 Donald Dissanayake
 Gamini Dissanayake
 Jayasena Dissanayake
 Mayantha Dissanayake
 W. M. P. B. Dissanayake
 Harindra Dunuwille

E 
 Nandimithra Ekanayake
 W. B. Ekanayake
 S. U. Ethirmanasingham

F 
 Harin Fernando
 Johnston Fernando
 Tyronne Fernando

G 
 Anoma Gamage
 Daya Gamage
 K. Ganeshalingam
 Dunesh Gankanda
 Mohan Lal Grero
 Earl Gunasekara
 Edward Gunasekara
 Tudor Gunasekara
 Bandula Gunawardane

H 
 M. H. A. Haleem
 Abdul Cader Shahul Hameed
 P. Harrison
 Kabir Hashim
 Renuka Herath
 Indradasa Hettiarachchi
 Wijepala Hettiarachchi
 E. L. B. Hurulle

I 
 Mansoor Ibrahim
 P. C. Imbulana
 I. M. R. A. Iriyagolla

J 
 Tuan Burhanudeen Jayah
 Chandrani Bandara Jayasinghe
 Ukwatte Jayasundera
 Karu Jayasuriya
 M. D. H. Jayawardena
 Junius Richard Jayawardene
 Jayalath Jayawardena
 John Kotelawala

K 
 S. R. Kanaganayagam
 C. W. W. Kannangara
 M. S. Kariapper
 Akila Viraj Kariyawasam
 Ravi Karunanayake
 Gayantha Karunathilaka
 Rupa Karunathilake
 Sanjeewa Kavirathna
 Lakshman Kiriella
 Karunasena Kodituwakku
 Nalaka Kolonne
 Ananda Kumarasiri
 Buddhika Kurukularatne

L 
 W. J. M. Lokubandara
 Gamini Lokuge

M 
 Imran Maharoof
 M. A. M. Maharoof
 M. E. H. Maharoof
 T. Maheswaran
 Vijayakala Maheswaran
 G. D. Mahindasoma
 M. Mahroof
 M. A. Abdul Majeed
 Weerasinghe Mallimarachchi
 Tilak Marapana
 Saidulla Marikkar
 Imthiaz Bakeer Markar
 Cyril Mathew
 M. E. H. Mohamed Ali
 M. H. Mohamed
 Seyed Ali Zahir Moulana
 Sarath Munasinghe
 M. Mohamed Musthaffa
 A. J. M. Muzammil

N 
 V. Nalliah
 Hemakumara Nanayakkara
 A. M. M. Naushad
 S. Natesan
 E. A. Nugawela

P 
 Karu Paranawithana
 Ajith Perera
 Janaka Perera
 Joseph Michael Perera
 Larine Perera
 Neomal Perera
 Niroshan Perera
 G. M. Premachandra
 Champika Premadasa
 Sajith Premadasa
 Ranasinghe Premadasa
 Lionel Premasiri
 Rasamanohari Pulendran
 Susantha Punchinilame

R 
 S. A. Raheem
 Mujibur Rahman (Sri Lankan politician)
 C. Rajadurai
 Perumal Rajadurai
 Harshana Rajakaruna
 Sarathchandra Rajakaruna
 Suranimala Rajapaksha
 Wijeyadasa Rajapakshe
 Ranjan Ramanayake
 Mahinda Ratnatilaka
 Abeyratne Ratnayaka
 Sagala Ratnayaka
 Amara Piyaseeli Ratnayake
 Anuruddha Ratwatte
 A. U. Romanis

S 
 D.S. Senanayake
 Dudley Senanayake
 Percy Samaraweera
 Ravindra Samaraweera
 Malik Samarawickrama
 M. Satchithanandan
 E. L. Senanayake
 Rosy Senanayake
 Rukman Senanayake
 Sujeewa Senasinghe
 Lakshman Senewiratne
 Sidney Jayarathna
 Duminda Silva
 C. A. Suriyaarachchi
 D. M. Swaminathan

T 
 Alfred Thambiayah
 S. Thambirajah
 Palitha Thewarapperuma
 A. Thiagarajah
 Hashan Tillakaratne

U 
 Udara Rathnayake

V 
 K. Velayudam

W 
 Dilip Wedaarachchi
 Samaraweera Weerawanni
 Jayampathy Wickramaratne
 Ranil Wickremesinghe
 A. F. Wijemanne
 Udena Wijerathna
 Ranjan Wijeratne
 Mahinda Wijesekara
 Nimal Wijesinghe
 A. A. Wijethunga
 Dingiri Banda Wijetunga
 Ruwan Wijewardene
 Anuradha Dullewe Wijeyeratne
 Edwin Wijeyeratne
 Neranjan Wijeyeratne
 Nissanka Wijeyeratne

Y 
Lakshman Yapa Abeywardena
 R. Yogarajan

See also 
 Leader of the United National Party
 History of United National Party

United National Party